Söhlde is a village and a municipality in the district of Hildesheim, in Lower Saxony, Germany. It is situated approximately 20 km east of Hildesheim, and 10 km northwest of Salzgitter.

Notable residents 

 Gottfried von Cramm (1909-1976), German tennis player
 Otto Ohlendorf (1907-1951, executed), SS general and Holocaust perpetrator, executed for war crimes

References 

Hildesheim (district)